Maximiliano Ricardo de la Cruz Reffino (born March 11, 1976) is a Uruguayan television host, actor and comedian.

Personal life 
Maximiliano Ricardo de la Cruz Reffino was born on March 11, 1976, the son of Hada Helena Reffino and Argentine Uruguayan actor, comedian, presenter and producer Cacho de la Cruz. He has two children: Candelaria (born 2001) and Santino (born 2017).

Career 
He began his career in the media in the early 1990s presenting El Club de las Tortugas Ninja on Teledoce with Paola Bianco. Then they both hosted Maxidibujos on National Television, and Maxanimados again on Teledoce, which brought them national recognition. At the age of 18 he joined the comedy show Plop!, which was a spin-off of the well-known show Telecataplúm. In 2001 he joined the cast of El Show del Mediodía, remaining in it until it went off the air in 2008.

In the 2000s, he hosted other successful programs broadcast on Teledoce, such as Telemental, and the Uruguayan version of El casting de la Tele with Eunice Castro and filmed at the Ideas del Sur studios in Buenos Aires. In 2013 De la Cruz presented the comedy show Sinvergüenza, which featured comedians Luis Orpi and Luciana Acuña. For his performance in this show he won the award for Best Male Television Presenter at the 20th Iris Awards, held on September 17, 2014, at the National Auditorium.

In 2014 De la Cruz presented the talent show Yo me llamo, whose panel of judges was composed of Roberto Musso, Lea Bensasson and Omar Varela. In 2015 he presented its second season and participated in Me Resbala, the Uruguayan version of the French format Vendredi, tout est permis avec Arthur. In 2017, he played Damo Gómez in Quiero vivir a tu lado, a soap opera broadcast on El Trece.

In 2020, he returned to television to host the game show Trato Hecho, the local version of Deal or no deal. At first, he presented the spin-off featuring celebrities, but after Sebastián Abreu resigned from hosting the original format, De la Cruz took over it until 2021. Since 2020, he has also been part of the cast of the male version of the comedy show La culpa es de Colón. In 2021, he began hosting the revival of 100 Uruguayos Dicen, and in 2022 the singing contest ¿Quién es la Máscara?, an adaptation of the South Korean format Masked Singer.

Filmography

Television

Film

Awards and nominations

References

External links 
 
 

21st-century Uruguayan male actors
Uruguayan television presenters
Uruguayan male comedians
Uruguayan people of Argentine descent
1976 births
Living people